The Moonah Classic was a golf tournament co-sanctioned by the PGA Tour of Australasia and the Nationwide Tour. It was played for the first time from 21 to 24 February 2008 at Moonah Links on the Mornington Peninsula, Victoria, Australia. The 2010 purse was US$700,000.

The tournament replaced the Jacob's Creek Open Championship.

Winners

Bolded golfers graduated to the PGA Tour at the end of the Nationwide Tour season.

Notes

External links
Coverage on PGA Tour of Australasia's official site
Coverage on Nationwide Tour's official site
Moonah Links site

Former PGA Tour of Australasia events
Former Korn Ferry Tour events
Golf tournaments in Australia
Sport in the Shire of Mornington Peninsula
Recurring sporting events established in 2008
Recurring sporting events disestablished in 2010
2008 establishments in Australia
2010 disestablishments in Australia
Defunct sports competitions in Australia